Miguel Rodrigo Pereira Vargas (born 18 November 1978) is a Portuguese former footballer who played as a winger.

Club career
An unsuccessful Sporting CP youth graduate, Lisbon-born Vargas only appeared for its reserves as a senior, also being loaned three times, the first at Académica de Coimbra where he made his Primeira Liga debut at age 19.

After his release in the summer of 2001, Vargas moved to F.C. Alverca, experiencing his most steady period in his country with three consecutive seasons – two of those in the top division – being relegated in 2003–04. Subsequently, he moved to U.D. Leiria, but quickly changed to G.D. Estoril Praia of the second level, initially on loan.

Vargas began playing abroad in the 2006 off-season, his first stop being with Cyprus' APOP Kinyras FC, being instrumental as the side managed to remain in the First Division during his tenure. He moved clubs in the same country in the January transfer window of 2009, signing with AEL Limassol and rejoining former Sporting (youth), Alverca and Leiria teammate Pedro Torrão; again an undisputed starter, he provided several assists to his team's goals while also scoring twice in as many wins (against Doxa Katokopias FC for the game's only and at Nea Salamis Famagusta FC, a 3–1 win, both in the 2009–10 campaign).

References

External links

1978 births
Living people
Footballers from Lisbon
Portuguese footballers
Association football wingers
Primeira Liga players
Liga Portugal 2 players
Segunda Divisão players
Sporting CP footballers
Associação Académica de Coimbra – O.A.F. players
F.C. Paços de Ferreira players
S.C. Espinho players
Sporting CP B players
F.C. Alverca players
U.D. Leiria players
G.D. Estoril Praia players
Cypriot First Division players
Cypriot Second Division players
APOP Kinyras FC players
AEL Limassol players
AEP Paphos FC players
Ayia Napa FC players
Portugal youth international footballers
Portugal under-21 international footballers
Portuguese expatriate footballers
Expatriate footballers in Cyprus
Portuguese expatriate sportspeople in Cyprus